The 1899 Montana football team represented the University of Montana in the 1899 college football season. They were led by first-year head coach Guy Cleveland and finished the season with a record of one win and two losses (1–2).

Schedule

References

Montana
Montana Grizzlies football seasons
Montana football